Éva Angyal (born April 18, 1955, in Budapest) is a former Hungarian handball player, World Championship silver medalist and Olympic Games bronze medalist.

References

External links
Profile on Database Olympics

1955 births
Living people
Hungarian female handball players
Handball players at the 1976 Summer Olympics
Handball players at the 1980 Summer Olympics
Olympic handball players of Hungary
Olympic bronze medalists for Hungary
Olympic medalists in handball
Medalists at the 1976 Summer Olympics
Handball players from Budapest
20th-century Hungarian women
21st-century Hungarian women